Cubers is a documentary film directed by Richard LeBlanc and produced by Walter Forsyth. The documentary's production began in Toronto, Ontario, Canada, but visits Paris, Budapest, Orlando, Tel Aviv, Toulouse and more. It was released in North America on CBC The Lens, followed by Biography, Access, and three other major stations.

The documentary has already appeared in the Orlando Film Festival, Asheville Film Festival, and the Silver Wave Film Festival. The official television premiere was on November 25, 2008 on CBC's Newsworld.

Plot
The documentary follows speedcubers from all over the world who can solve the Rubik's Cube in less than 30 seconds through the obstacles of becoming crowned the World Rubik's Cube Champion.

Press
CUBERS has been getting attention in the Maritimes, including Halifax where the documentary held its premiere on September 14, 2008. There are articles online about the film and all mostly interview the film's director, Richard LeBlanc. In mostly of the articles, it can be read that LeBlanc has not yet solved the Rubik's Cube, despite making an entire film on the subject. Leblanc hopes to solve the puzzle before the premiere.

After a successful premiere at the Atlantic Film Festival, CUBERS has gotten articles on Yahoo, Metro News, and mentions on Maritime radio.

External links
 
 
CBC The Lens Cubers Page

Canadian documentary television films
Rubik's Cube
2008 films
2000s English-language films
2000s Canadian films